Narnia may refer to:

C. S. Lewis
The Chronicles of Narnia, a series of fantasy novels by C. S. Lewis
 Narnia (world), the world in which the series is set 
 Narnia (country), the country within the world

Other uses
 Narnia (band), a Swedish Christian melodic metal band
 "Narnia", a track on Please Don't Touch, a 1978 Steve Hackett rock album 
 "Narnia", 2007 Born of Osiris demo that became "The Takeover" on The New Reign album
 Narnia (insect), a genus of leaf-footed bugs
 Narni, the Latin name of the ancient hilltown in central Italy previously called Narnia